Pseudalypia crotchii is a moth of the family Noctuidae. It is found in California and Colorado.

Pseudalypia crotchii is a highly unusual Acontiinae species and is unlikely to be confused with any other species in the subfamily or in the Noctuidae as a whole. The basic color is black. The costa is white. The outer margin of the hindwing has a pure white fringe. Two basic forms of the species exist. Both forms occur in both sexes. The first form has a wide white stripe in the general position of the postmedial line and a white spot at the apex of the forewing. The second form lacks these white markings. The forewing length from base to apex in one selected individual is 11 mm.

The larvae feed on Malvastrum exile and Malvastrum parviflora.

References

External links
Image

Acontiinae
Moths described in 1874